Simon Marks, 1st Baron Marks of Broughton (9 July 1888 – 8 December 1964), was an English retail businessman and baron, the son of Michael Marks, the co-founder of major British multinational company Marks & Spencer.

Biography

Early life
Marks was born in the Leylands, Leeds, on 9 July 1888, son of Michael Marks and Hannah Cohen, and educated at Manchester Grammar School.

Career
In 1907, he inherited a number of "penny bazaars" from his father, which had been established with Thomas Spencer. With the help of Israel Sieff, he built Marks & Spencer into an icon of British business.

He was knighted on 4 July 1944 and on 10 July 1961 was raised to the peerage as Baron Marks of Broughton, of Sunningdale in the Royal County of Berkshire.

Death and legacy

Marks died 8 December 1964, in London, and was cremated at Golders Green Crematorium. His ashes and memorial are housed within the internal columbarium (visible by arrangement). The ashes of his wife Miriam Marks (née Sieff, sister of Israel Sieff), and those of his business partner Israel Sieff, rest with his.

He was succeeded in the barony by his only son, Michael Marks, 2nd Baron Marks of Broughton,  who died in 1998 and was succeeded in the title by his own son, Simon Marks, 3rd Baron Marks of Broughton.

Coat of arms

References

1888 births
1964 deaths
English Jews
Businesspeople from Leeds
British businesspeople in retailing
Marks-Sacher family
Hereditary barons created by Elizabeth II
Jewish British politicians
20th-century English businesspeople